Vinay Govindankutty or better known as Vinay Govind (born 3 March 1988) is an Indian film director. His first feature directional venture, Kili Poyi debuted on 1 March 2013. The film opened to mixed response from the critics,  though found major fanfare among the youth. Kili Poyi is also one of the few stoner films produced in the country.

Early life and education 
Vinay was born in Perinthalmanna, a town in the Malappuram District of Kerala. He completed his high school in Presentation English Medium High School,  Perinthalmanna. He graduated in visual communications from Loyola College, Chennai, a prominent institution in Southern India.

Career
Vinay started his career in the advertisement film industry before moving to being an associate director to V. K. Prakash. He debuted as an Assistant director with Prakash's 2011 blockbuster Beautiful.

Filmography

References

1988 births
Living people
People from Malappuram district
Malayalam film directors
Film directors from Kerala
Loyola College, Chennai alumni